Leng Pei Tsuen is a village in Fanling, North District, Hong Kong.

Administration
Leng Pei Tsuen is a recognized village under the New Territories Small House Policy. It is one of the villages represented within the Fanling District Rural Committee. For electoral purposes, Leng Pei Tsuen is part of the Queen's Hill constituency, which is currently represented by Law Ting-tak.

History
In 2020, the Drainage Services Department had announced the tender of the construction consisting of about six kilometres of sewers in three unsewered areas in Fanling Wai, So Kwun Po and Leng Pei Tsuen to improve environmental hygiene and further reduce the amount of pollutants being discharged into the nearby River Indus and Deep Bay. The project commenced in January 2021 and is expected to be completed in 2025, costing about HK$180,000,000.

References

Further reading
 Agreement No. CE 45/2008 (CE) Liantang / Heung Yuen Wai Boundary Control Point and Associated Works -Environmental Impact Assessment Report. Appendix 12.2f: Detailed Records of Identified Built Heritage Features within CHIA Study Area of the Lau Shui Heung Tunnel Section (South Tunnel)

External links

 Delineation of area of existing village Leng Pei Tsuen (Fanling) for election of resident representative (2019 to 2022)

Villages in North District, Hong Kong
Fanling